Hatfield Hyde Halt was a halt-layout railway station. The station was part of the Hertford and Welwyn Junction Railway, near the garden city of Welwyn, which was established in 1920, by which time Hatfield Hyde Halt had long been closed.

History
The station was built as part of the Great Northern Railway; it was built at the same time as the nearby Attimore Hall Halt railway station. They both were opened in May 1905, and they both closed, for lack of use, on 1 July 1905. Both were only open for just over a month.

Route

See also
List of closed railway stations in Britain
Great Northern Railway (Great Britain)

Notes

Disused railway stations in Hertfordshire
Former Great Northern Railway stations
Railway stations in Great Britain opened in 1905
Railway stations in Great Britain closed in 1905
1905 establishments in England
1905 disestablishments in England